Kévin Campion (born 23 May 1988) is a male French racewalker. He competed in the 20 kilometres walk event at the 2015 World Championships in Athletics in Beijing, China. In 2019, he competed in the men's 20 kilometres walk at the 2019 World Athletics Championships held in Doha, Qatar. He finished in 16th place.

See also
 France at the 2015 World Championships in Athletics

References

External links
 

1988 births
Living people
French male racewalkers
People from Vénissieux
World Athletics Championships athletes for France
Athletes (track and field) at the 2016 Summer Olympics
Athletes (track and field) at the 2020 Summer Olympics
Olympic athletes of France
French Athletics Championships winners
Sportspeople from Lyon Metropolis
20th-century French people
21st-century French people